Weston is a civil parish in Cheshire East, England. It contains 17 buildings that are recorded in the National Heritage List for England as designated listed buildings.  Of these, one is listed at Grade II*, the middle of the three grades, and the others are at Grade II.  The parish contains the villages of Weston and Englesea-Brook, and the southern part of the Crewe Hall estate.  The listed buildings include houses, cottages and a lodge in the Crewe estate.. Elsewhere there are houses and cottages, a public house, a church, and a signpost.  In Englesea-Brook the former Primitive Methodist church is now a museum, and its founder has a memorial in the churchyard opposite.

Key

Buildings

References

Citations

Sources

 

 

Listed buildings in the Borough of Cheshire East
Lists of listed buildings in Cheshire
Borough of Cheshire East